Cvijeta Zuzorić (also Fiora Zuzori or Flora Zuzzeri) (1552–1648) was a lyric poet from the Republic of Ragusa. She wrote in Italian, Latin and Croatian.

Life

She was born in Ragusa, (now called Dubrovnik) into a prominent merchant family, she was the daughter of Frano Zuzori and Marina Radagli. Early in her childhood, she moved with her parents to Ancona, where she was educated. 

In 1570, she married a Florentine nobleman, merchant, and diplomat Bartolomeo Pescioni who had been Florentine consul in the Republic of Ragusa. In the same year, the couple moved to Ragusa where they lived for thirteen years, until Pescioni's debts and bankruptcy stemming from his failed textile trade business forced them to move back to Ancona, where she died.

Being a well-educated woman, she invited numerous authors and artists to her house, which was home to a widely known literary academy. Zuzorić was an exceptionally beautiful and intelligent woman, was said to have written excellent epigrams and gentle rhymes, most of which, however, have not survived. She is known only by reputation, since she was mentioned and celebrated in countless poems by Dinko Zlatarić, Miho Bona-Babulinov, Miho Monaldi, Boccabinco, Simonetti, Marin Bettera, her contemporaries, as well as later Ragusan authors.

She was mentioned in the sonnets of the famous Italian poet Torquato Tasso, who praised her virtues and beauty even though he had never met her. Her great friend Nikola Vitov Gučetić and his wife Marija Gundulić Gucić described her physical and spiritual beauty in his famous philosophical work on love, a treatise on the Meteors of Aristotle.

See also

Republic of Ragusa
List of notable Ragusans
Dubrovnik
Dalmatia
History of Dalmatia
Cvijeta Zuzorić Art Pavilion

Notes

Sources

Bloomsbury Guide to Women's Literature
Slučaj Cvijete Zuzorić. Državni udar ljepotom 

1550s births
1648 deaths
Ragusan poets